David Mitchell is an Irish actor known for playing Jimmy Doyle in soap opera Fair City for 17 years.

Mitchell was born in Dublin. His parents are Ann Fitzpatrick and Paddy Mitchell. His family home is in Finglas, Dublin. Mitchell has recently moved to America. He won RTÉ's You're a Star Charity Special, a talent contest in which he defeated seven other celebrities.

Selected filmography
 Grey Angel Journals: 2017
 You're a Star Charity Special: 2005
 Fair City: 1991-2008

See also
 List of Fair City characters
 List of longest-serving soap opera actors#Ireland

References

External links
 

Year of birth missing (living people)
Living people
Irish male soap opera actors
Irish male television actors
Male actors from Dublin (city)
Singing talent show winners
You're a Star contestants